SCORE Class 6 in off-road racing is an open production unlimited class that competes in the SCORE off-road race series including the Baja 1000, Baja 500, Baja Sur 500, San Felipe 250 and the SCORE Desert Challenge.  Unlimited 4 wheel vehicles.  Class 6 was added in 2009.

Vehicle description
Unlimited four-wheel vehicles. Vehicles must have a production appearing Utility or Sports Utility body. Ford Ranger dominated the class Lexus LX series and Toyota 4runner are previous participants.

Class requirements

Engine
Engine may be of any manufacture as that of the body. Engine limited to a maximum of six cylinders.

Suspension
Track width must not exceed 87 inches as measured outside of tire to outside of tire.

Body
Must maintain a production appearing body. Stock appearing grill and headlight openings must be retained. Body subject to SCORE approval.

References

SCORE International (2011). "2011-2015 Off-Road Racing Rules and Regulations".
SCORE International. " 2009 New Classes & Existing Class Rule Amendments"

External links
Official SCORE International website